Thomas Sheehan is an American elementary school teacher and reality television personality, best known for winning Survivor: Island of the Idols and competing on The Challenge: Spies, Lies & Allies.

Early life
Sheehan was born in the Maspeth neighborhood of Queens, New York City, and raised in Bayville, New York, on Long Island, with his parents, Sandy and Tom, and older sister, Caitlin. He attended Locust Valley High School in Lattingtown, and then went on to attend college at SUNY Cortland, where he graduated in 2014. From there, he went on to become a fourth-grade teacher for the Floral Park-Bellerose Union Free School District on Long Island.

Television Appearances

Survivor
In 2019, Sheehan participated in Survivor: Island of the Idols, the 39th overall season of Survivor. He began on the Vokai tribe where he formed bonds with many of his fellow tribemates—in particular, Jack Nichting and Lauren Beck. Throughout the game, his many friendships enabled him to receive key information about the game from several other castaways. On Night 32, Dean Kowalski tipped Sheehan off about a plan by Elaine Stott to blindside Sheehan. This led to last-second scrambling which ultimately took the target off his back. The next day, Janet Carbin found a hidden immunity idol and shared it with him. A few days later, Kowalski showed his own idol nullifier, acquired on the Island of the Idols, exclusively to Sheehan. Once the castaways had moved to the Island of the Idols for the final few days of the game, Sheehan returned the favor, by sharing a clue to another hidden idol with Kowalski.

On Day 38, Noura Salman won the final immunity challenge. In response, Sheehan convinced her of his inability to make fire, stating that if they wanted to eliminate Beck, the biggest threat left in the game, Salman would have to pit Beck and Kowalski against each other in the Final Four fire-making competition which would determine the third finalist. Salman did just that, allowing Sheehan to advance into the finals. Beck was defeated in the fire-making battle, allowing Kowalski to join Salman and Sheehan in the finals on Day 39.

At the Final Tribal Council, Sheehan stated that he made strong social bonds with many people in his tribe, enabling him to control the ebb and flow of the game. He was questioned by the jury over his lack of big moves as opposed to fellow finalist Kowalski. However, Sheehan and Salman criticised Kowalski for riding others’ coattails for much of the game. On December 18, 2019, it was revealed that Sheehan won the title of Sole Survivor, by an 8–2–0 vote, receiving votes from everyone on the jury except Aaron Meredith and Elizabeth Beisel. After the results were announced, Sheehan stated that, in spite of winning the $1 million, he would keep his job as a teacher.

The Challenge
In 2021, Sheehan competed on the thirty-seventh season of The Challenge titled Spies, Lies & Allies. He was medically removed from the competition after suffering a concussion in episode 3.

Personal life
As of 2017, he was living in Long Beach, a small community in Nassau County, New York. In addition to teaching, he also works as a lifeguard and a high-school sports referee.

Filmography

Television

References

External links
Official CBS biography page

Schoolteachers from New York (state)
Living people
People from Nassau County, New York
State University of New York at Cortland alumni
Survivor (American TV series) winners
1992 births
Winners in the Survivor franchise
The Challenge (TV series) contestants